O Pioneers! is a 1992 American made-for-television drama film based on the 1913 novel of the same title by Willa Cather.  It originally aired as a Hallmark Hall of Fame presentation on February 2, 1992, on CBS and stars Jessica Lange. It was also the film debut for Anne Heche, who had a small supporting role in the film.

Plot summary
The film centers around a family of Swedish immigrants in Nebraska around the turn of the 20th century. The family's father dies and leaves the family farm to his daughter.  She does her best to make the farm work when many others are giving up and leaving.

Cast
 Jessica Lange as Alexandra Bergson
 David Strathairn as Carl Linstrum
 Tom Aldredge as Ivar
 Reed Diamond as Emil
 Josh Hamilton as Young Carl Linstrum
 Heather Graham as Young Alexandra Bergson
 Anne Heche as Marie

Filming locations
Much of the filming was done on location in and around Johnstown,  in northern Nebraska.  Many of the buildings used are still in use today and retain the board sidewalks seen in sections of the film. Additional scenes were filmed in Clarkson, Nebraska, in the northeast part of the state, at what was then the city's library, as well as a small farmhouse north of town.

Reception
It first aired on television on February 2, 1992, and was the second-most watched primetime show of the week.

Awards and nominations
Awards
 1992 Emmy Award - Outstanding Individual Achievement in Music Composition for a Miniseries or a Special (Dramatic Underscore)
1993 Western Heritage Award - Television Feature Film
 Nominations
 1992 Emmy Award - Outstanding Individual Achievement in Hairstyling for a Miniseries or a Special
 1993 Golden Globe award - Best Performance by an Actress in a Mini-Series or Motion Picture Made for TV (Jessica Lange).

References

External links
 
 

1992 television films
1992 films
1992 drama films
CBS network films
Films about immigration to the United States
Films set in Nebraska
Films shot in Nebraska
Hallmark Hall of Fame episodes
Films set in the 1890s
Swedish-American culture in Nebraska
Willa Cather
Films directed by Glenn Jordan
Films based on American novels
Films scored by Bruce Broughton
American drama television films
1990s American films